Kim Bora (born 1981) is a South Korean film producer.

Kim Bo-ra may also refer to:

 Kim Bo-ra (born 1995), South Korean actress
 Kim Bo-ra (politician) (born 1969), South Korean politician based in Anseong
  Kim Bora (born 1994), stage name SuA, main dancer and vocalist of South Korean pop rock group Dreamcatcher